Hasan Mashadi Huseyn oghlu Aghayev (1875 – 1920), known also as Hasan bey Aghayev and Hasan bey Aghazade was an Azerbaijani public figure, journalist, medical doctor, teacher and politician. He served as the Deputy Speaker of National Assembly of Azerbaijan Democratic Republic (ADR).

Early life
Aghayev was born in 1875 in Yelisavetpol (Ganja), Elizavetpol uezd, Elizavetpol Governorate of Russian Empire. Aghayev, whose education was financed by Azerbaijani businessman Haji Zeynalabdin Taghiyev, graduated from the Medical Department of Moscow State University in 1901. After graduation, he worked as a public doctor and was a part-time journalist, writing for several Azerbaijani newspapers such as "Irshad", "Taraggi" and "Heqiqat", the editor of which was composer Uzeyir Hajibeyov. The main focus of his articles in newspapers was on elimination of social causes to diseases and illnesses. He was also active in social and cultural life of Baku.
During the second teachers' congress in 1907, he was elected Chairman of Nijat Enlightenment Society. In 1911-1912, he published "Cənubi Qafqaz" newspaper in Elisabethpol. He also chaired the Muslim educational committee in the same city in 1911. In 1914, in cooperation with Khudadat Rafibeyli and Musa bey Rafiyev, he founded Medical Society of Elisabethpol.

Political activity
In March 1917, Aghayev co-founded and was elected member of Central Committee of Turkic Federalists and in June of the same year, member of the Central Committee of Musavat Party. In December 1917, he was elected a deputy to Transcaucasian Sejm.
Hasan bey Aghayev was deputy chairman of the Azerbaijani National Council, chaired by Mammad Emin Rasulzade and one of co-signers of the Declaration of Independence of Azerbaijan Democratic Republic (ADR) on May 28, 1918 in Tiflis, Georgia. From September to December 1918, Aghayev was the Chief Medical Doctor of Azerbaijan State Railway.

On December 7, 1918 Aghayev and Mammad Yusif Jafarov were elected Deputy Speakers of the National Assembly of Azerbaijan and because the speaker of the assembly, Alimardan Topchubashev was part of the Azerbaijani diplomatic mission attending Paris Peace Conference, 1919, Aghayev was acting chairman of the parliament until February 2, 1920. After occupation of Azerbaijan by the 11th Red Army in April 1920, Aghayev moved to Tiflis. On July 19, 1920 he was assassinated by Armenian patriots Aram Yerganian and Misak Grigoryan.

See also
 Azerbaijani National Council

References

1875 births
1920 deaths
Writers from Ganja, Azerbaijan
People from Elizavetpol Governorate
Azerbaijan Democratic Republic politicians
Members of the National Assembly (Azerbaijan)
Azerbaijani physicians
Azerbaijani educators
Imperial Moscow University alumni
Assassinated Azerbaijani politicians
Assassinated Azerbaijani journalists
20th-century Azerbaijani educators
Azerbaijani independence activists
Physicians from the Russian Empire
Journalists from the Russian Empire
Educators from the Russian Empire
Politicians from Ganja, Azerbaijan
Burials at Pantheon of prominent Azerbaijanis